Any Day is a 2018 studio album by the Sea and Cake, released on Thrill Jockey.

Critical reception 

Any Day received generally positive reviews from music critics.

References 

2018 albums
The Sea and Cake albums
Thrill Jockey albums